United States Marine Corps Scout Sniper (MOS 0317, formerly 8541) is a secondary MOS (Military Occupational Specialty) designator of U.S. Marine Corps infantrymen and reconnaissance Marines that have graduated from a U.S. Marine Corps Scout Sniper School. Scout Snipers must earn the rank of Lance Corporal, be selected by their battalion to join the scout-sniper platoon, and complete an approved scout-sniper course in order to receive this designation.

History
A USMC Scout Sniper is a Marine, highly skilled in fieldcraft and marksmanship, who can deliver long-range precision fire on selected targets from concealed positions in support of combat operations. The first Scout Snipers were trained near San Diego, California in 1943 and saw combat in the Pacific Theater of Operations during World War II.

A USMC Scout Sniper Team is a detachment of one or more sniper teams performing an assigned task of engaging selected targets, targets of opportunity, collecting and reporting information, or a combination of all, contributing to the accomplishment of the supported unit's mission.

Surveillance and Target Acquisition (STA) Platoons, very similar units, existed until shortly after the Gulf War. They consisted of Scout Snipers and Intelligence Marines.

A Scout Sniper Platoon is composed of 8–10 Scout Sniper teams, some of which are specially suited for night operations and fully capable of operating in almost complete darkness through use of night vision scopes and infrared laser equipment. Typically, each Scout Sniper team has two members. One sniper is equipped with a long-range, specially-made sniper rifle, such as the M40; he is also frequently issued an M9 9mm pistol. The spotter is typically armed with an M4 carbine and uses a high-power spotting scope to spot targets and follow-up shots for the shooter. The shooter/spotter relationship is not always set; some platoons establish designated shooters, while others have team members switch off. Within a platoon, there are four Special Application Scoped Rifles (SASR), chambered in .50 BMG, such as the M82, or M107. These can be issued to a team as needed to give supported commanders the option of taking out heavy equipment or heavily armored targets.

Controversial use of the "SS" symbol

In February 2012, U.S. media reported that Marine scout snipers had been using the double Sig rune (ϟϟ, "SS") in its "Armanen" form to symbolize their function since at least the 1980s. The same stylized double rune was the symbol of the SS, the Nazi organization that was instrumental in conducting the Holocaust. Strong media criticism of this practice ensued. The Commandant of the Marine Corps gave orders to stop it, issued an apology, and ordered an investigation into the prevalence of this practice.
 
A Marine official was quoted as saying that their leadership believed that the Marines did not understand the logo's significance. The Military Religious Freedom Foundation, which had helped circulate an image of snipers posing with a blue "SS" flag, questioned this assumption, writing that the flag was sold by a website dedicated to German World War II and Nazi memorabilia.

Despite the official prohibition, the New York Times reported in 2020 that the "SS" logo continues to be used by Marines, "much like a secret handshake".

Overview
Scout Snipers provide close reconnaissance and surveillance to the infantry battalion. By doctrine, a Scout Sniper is a Marine highly skilled in field craft and marksmanship who delivers long range precision fire on selected targets from concealed positions in support of combat operations.

Scout Snipers in Marine infantry battalions fell under the Surveillance and Target Acquisition (STA) units initially, and now, more formalized, they belong to the infantry battalion's Scout Sniper Platoon (SSP), usually within the Headquarters and Service (H&S) Company or Weapons Company. Marine Scout Snipers are trained at one of the four school house locations.

The term "Scout Sniper" is only used officially by the Marine Corps, but it does not imply a differing mission from the U.S. Army Sniper. An Army Sniper's primary mission is to support combat operations by delivering precise long-range fire on selected targets. By this, the sniper creates casualties among enemy troops, slows enemy movement, frightens enemy soldiers, lowers morale, and adds confusion to their operations. The sniper's secondary mission is collecting and reporting battlefield information, Section 1.1 FM 23-10 Sniper Training.

The Marine Corps is unique in its consolidation of reconnaissance and sniper duties for a single Marine. Most other conventional armed forces, including the U.S. Army, separate the reconnaissance soldier or scout from the sniper. In the U.S. Army, the 19D MOS, "Cavalry Scout" is the primary special reconnaissance and surveillance soldier and the term "Infantry Scout" refers to a specially trained infantrymen that functions in a reconnaissance and surveillance capacity, while "Sniper" refers to a specially selected and trained soldier that primarily functions as a sniper. Most military forces believe that the separation of reconnaissance and sniper capabilities allows for a higher degree of specialization.

Scout Sniper Course

The Marine Scout Sniper Course qualifies students as Marine Corps Scout Snipers. The graduation rate in 2017 was 44 percent.  There are currently three different school houses in the Marine Corps that offer the Scout Sniper Course.

 School of Infantry (West), Marine Corps Base Camp Pendleton, California
 Marine Corps Base Camp Lejeune, North Carolina
 Marine Corps Base Quantico, Virginia

In 2009, a major change in curriculum occurred with the Scout Sniper Basic Course and it was shortened from the traditional 10-week course to an 8 week course. This was done concurrently with the removal of the Advanced Course and the addition of the Team Leader Course of four weeks. This reduction of 1 weeks is because of the removal of the course's mission planning phase and the addition of this curriculum to the Team Leader Course. Missions are still conducted during the course's last week, but are now not a major part of curriculum.

In 2010, a new curriculum was introduced, with shooting as the course's primary focus and stalking a secondary focus. The new course is now 12 weeks long. With elimination of the advanced course, Scout Sniper Basic Course was re-designated as the "Scout Sniper Course". There are nine straight weeks of shooting qualifications, before the majority of field training.

Basic requirements
These are the basic requirements that must be met in order to attend school. Units vary with indocs and pre-reqs.

Minimum Requirements: As per HQMC School Quota Message:
 Criteria: 60 days prior to a class convening, the G-3 at each division will receive a message from HQMC stating the number of funded quotas given to each division, the gear list, report date, and criteria for attending.

Marines who do not meet the following prerequisites will be denied entrance to the program and returned to their units.
 Must hold any rank from  Lance Corporal (E-3) to Captain (O-3), inclusive.
 Infantry MOS or MOS 0203 (Ground Intelligence Officer).
 Vision correctable to 20/20 in both eyes. Color blindness is discouraged.
 Serving in or designated for assignment to a Scout Sniper billet.
 Minimum of 12 months remaining on current contract on completion of course (does not apply to reservists).
 Must score a First Class Physical Fitness Test on the day the course convenes.
 Current rifle Expert. Must have qualified in the last fiscal year. (Reservist can have a score three years old, but must be current Expert.)
 No courts martial or NJP within the last six months.
 Minimum GT of 100 (General Technical on the ASVAB)
 No history of mental illness.
 Must be a volunteer.
 It is highly recommended, but not required, for the student to have completed the following MCI courses: Land Navigation, Patrolling, Calling and Adjusting Supporting Arms, and Reconnaissance Marine. It is also recommended, but not required, that the student have conducted basic Scout Sniper field skills: stalks, concealment, field sketches, range cards, range estimations, and firing of the M40A1 rifle prior to attending the course. Students should also possess a high degree of maturity, equanimity, and common sense.
 Swim Qual: 500 meter swim using side or breast stroke, 50 meter swim holding a weight out of water, tread water for 30 seconds holding a weight out of water, no signs of panic.

Phases of training
 Phase 1: Marksmanship and Basic Fields Craft Phase
 During this phase, Marines are trained in basic marksmanship on the Known Distance (KD) Range and also receive classes in basic skills such as camouflage, individual movement, weapons systems, observations, and field sketches.
 Day one begins with in processing, which includes a PFT, gear check, and service record check for prerequisite compliance. Potential students must also pass day and night land navigation courses. After all students have been admitted to the course, classes and a general overview of the course are given.
 KD range includes shooting at the 300, 500, 600, 700, 800, 900, and 1000 yard lines. Five rounds are fired at each yard line. During this phase of training, Marines must become experts at the fundamentals of marksmanship. They must also become experts at calling wind and weather. During this portion two students work together, one on the rifle and the other behind the spotting scope calling wind. If a student is not proficient at calling wind, they will cause their partner to fail, not themselves. After the first student fires his rounds, the two switch positions. After each yard line, the students must quickly throw on their packs and grab all their equipment and run to the next yard line. The course of fire for qualification is as follows:
 300, 500, & 600: three stationary and two movers
 700: three stationary and two stop and go movers
 800: three stationary and two bobbers
 900 & 1000: five stationary
 Out of 35 rounds, 28 rounds must be in the black to qualify on the range.
 After the range students head back to the schoolhouse and clean weapons. After this important task they immediately do a field sketch and observation exercises. Often a Kim's Game is conducted as well.
 During an observation, students must use their M49 Spotting Scope and binoculars to find 10 hidden items in a specifically defined area. These observations can be done at short distances utilizing miniature items, or at long distances with full sized items. Observations are an essential skill that the sniper must learn to be effective. Furthermore, for the purposes of the course it is important to learn observation skills, particularly how to "Burn Through" bushes for the stalking phase. Learning this skill is imperative to being able to find the observation post from behind cover during stalking and is often the difference between a student passing or failing. An overall average of 70% must be obtained on observations to pass the course.
 During a field sketch, students are given an hour and a specific area or building to sketch. The target must be drawn with as many details as possible. It must include information about its surroundings and target reference points on the sketch. Sketches are graded for neatness, correctness, details, and usable information. An overall average of 70% must be obtained on field sketches to pass the course.
 Phase 2: Unknown Distance and Stalking
 The UKD (Unknown Distance) and Stalking portion kicks off as soon as Phase 1 is completed. During this phase students will become experts at engaging targets at unknown distances by way of range estimation and range cards.
 During the unknown distance phase students will run 100-pound steel targets out to ranges between 300 and 800 yards. There are 10 targets in each course of fire, and after each course of fire, the targets are rearranged.
 A student has two attempts to hit each target, a first round impact is worth 10 points and a second is worth 8. An overall average of 80% must be obtained during the 3 weeks of UKD to pass the course. **Thereafter, the portion of the course with the highest attrition rate begins, stalking.
 Stalking involves moving from a distance between 1200 and 800 yards to within 200 yards of an observation post (OP) undetected. After doing this, the student must set up a Final Firing Position (FFP) and fire two shots without being found by the OP within a time period of 3–4 hours.
 After the first shot is fired, a walker (a neutral instructor who does not help students or the instructors in the OP) will get close to the sniper's position to make sure he can positively ID the OP. Positive ID is established by the observers holding up cards with 2-3 letters on them above their binoculars. The sniper must then correctly tell the walker what is written on them. After positive ID has been confirmed, the walker will move within 10 yards of the shooter and inform the OP that he is within 10. The OP will then attempt to walk the walker onto the sniper's position by way of movement commands. The OP must get the walker within 1 foot of the shooter. If the shooter cannot be found, the walker will tell the shooter to fire a second shot on his command. After the second shot has been fired, the OP will look for blast from the rifle or movement from the shooter. If the OP cannot find the shooter, then the walker will indicate the shooters position to the OP and check to make sure the shooter had the correct windage and elevation settings, along with correct position and stable shooting platform.
 Grading is as follows for stalking:
 0: Being out of bounds on the stalk lane, not freezing on the command freeze (when the OP believes they know the position of a student, they call freeze and all students on the stalk lane have to immediately freeze in whatever position they are in), poor FFP.
 40: Caught out of range or fired out of range (not within 200 yards).
 50: Caught within range.
 60: 1 shot fired but, no positive ID, incorrect windage or elevation, unstable shooting platform.
 70: 1 shot fired and positive ID, correct windage, elevation, shooting platform but OP walked onto shooter after first shot.
 80: 2 shots fired and positive ID, correct windage, elevation, shooting platform but OP saw blast from shooter's position after second shot.
 100: 2 shots fired and positive ID, correct windage, elevation, shooting platform and shooter was never found.
 Students must obtain an overall average of 70% out of 10 stalks, with a minimum of two 100s and no more than a single zero in order to pass stalking.
 Phase 3: Advanced Field Skills and Mission Employment

Other schools

After graduating the basic course, Marines are given the opportunity to obtain a variety of other courses to further refine their skills.

 Urban Snipers
 High Angle (Mountain) Snipers
 Scout Snipers Team leader course (formerly the advanced course)
 Foreign Forces Snipers Schools
 British Royal Marine Snipers School
 Israeli Foreign Forces Snipers School

Duties
A Marine Corps Scout Sniper is a Marine highly skilled in fieldcraft and marksmanship who delivers long range precision fire, on select targets, from concealed positions in support of combat operations.

 Support combat operations by delivering precision fire on selected targets.
 Establish concealed sniper/observation sites from which targets are analyzed, engaged, and information gathered.
 Use map and compass for day or night land navigation.
 Operate and maintain weapons and optical equipment employed by the Scout Sniper

Notable Scout Snipers

 Carlos Hathcock, during the Vietnam War had 93 confirmed kills, 300–400 estimated kills, and until 2002, had the longest recorded shot made by a Scout Sniper.
 Chuck Mawhinney, USMC Scout/Sniper during Vietnam War, credited with 103 Confirmed Kills and 216+ probable kills during 16 months in Vietnam
 Lee Marvin, scout-sniper during World War II and Purple heart recipient. After war, actor and Academy Award winner
 Dakota Meyer, a Medal of Honor recipient, was a scout-sniper working with Embedded Training Team 2-8 for actions during Battle of Ganjgal of the War in Afghanistan.
Eric England, also known as The Phantom of Phu Bai, was a sniper during the Vietnam War. 98 confirmed kills in 7 months; wounded by mortar. Returned to Vietnam, making as many as 200 additional unconfirmed enemy kills.

See also
 United States Army Sniper School
 Marksmanship badges (United States)
 Hog's tooth
 Intelligence, surveillance, target acquisition, and reconnaissance

 Related military roles
 Designated marksman
 Jäger (military)
 Marksman
 Scout
 Skirmisher
 Sniper

 Related military operations
 Operation Foxley – plan to kill Adolf Hitler using a sniper
 Sniper Alley
 Snipers of the Soviet Union
 Special forces

 Related military weapons
 Anti-materiel rifle
 Anti-tank rifle
 Sniper rifle

References

Further reading 
  Taylor's experience as a scout sniper during the Vietnam War.

External links

 U.S.M.C. Scout Sniper website
 United States Marine Corps Scout/Sniper Association
 AmericanSnipers.org

Sniper warfare
United States Marine Corps organization
United States Marines